Juan Carlos Aguilera Martín (born 22 May 1969) is a Spanish retired professional footballer. Having started his career as a right winger, he finished it at his first club, Atlético Madrid, as a right-back. During a professional career which spanned almost two decades he appeared in more than 500 games, 375 in La Liga.

Aguilera represented Spain at the 1998 World Cup.

Career
Born in Madrid, Aguilera began his career at Atlético Madrid, and his debut for the first team came on 26 March 1988 against Sporting de Gijón, after having started the season at the reserve side. He played for the Colchoneros until 1993, helping them to two consecutive Copa del Rey trophies (1991 and 1992).

Aguilera then signed with CD Tenerife, staying at the Estadio Heliodoro Rodríguez López a further three years. Incidentally, his best season in La Liga, 1995–96 – with five goals in 39 matches as the islanders qualified for the UEFA Cup – came as Atlético reached an historical double.

In 1996, Aguilera returned to his first team, staying with them even after a 2000 relegation and again putting up strong numbers in two seasons in Segunda División, featuring in 78 games and scoring 14 goals combined. In 2003–04, he even accepted to take a pay cut to remain with the club. His form during his return led to a selection for the Spain national team, his debut coming on 24 September 1997 against Slovakia in a 1998 FIFA World Cup qualifier.

Aguilera was included in the squad for the final stages in France, starting against Paraguay (0–0) and Bulgaria (6–1 win) and totalling seven caps during a one-year span. He retired from the game in 2005, and returned to Atlético in directorial capacities six years later.

Honours
Atlético Madrid
Copa del Rey: 1990–91, 1991–92; runner-up 1998–99, 1999–2000
Segunda División: 2001–02

References

External links
 
 
 

1969 births
Living people
Footballers from Madrid
Spanish footballers
Association football defenders
Association football wingers
La Liga players
Segunda División players
Segunda División B players
Atlético Madrid B players
Atlético Madrid footballers
CD Tenerife players
Spain under-21 international footballers
Spain international footballers
1998 FIFA World Cup players